Melanolepis is a plant genus of the family Euphorbiaceae, first described as a genus in 1856. It is native to Southeast Asia, New Guinea, and some islands of the western Pacific.

Species
 Melanolepis multiglandulosa (Reinw. ex Blume) Rchb. & Zoll - Nansei-shoto, Mariana Islands, Solomon Islands, Bismarck Archipelago, New Guinea, Maluku, Sulawesi, Philippines, Lesser Sunda Islands, Java, Sumatra, Borneo, Thailand, Malaysia, Taiwan
 Melanolepis vitifolia (Kuntze) Gagnep. - Vietnam, Cambodia

References

Chrozophoreae
Euphorbiaceae genera
Taxa named by Heinrich Zollinger
Taxa named by Heinrich Gustav Reichenbach